The following is a list of works by Israel Shahak.

Books
 Israel Shahak, (ed.), The Non-Jew in the Jewish State; a collection of Documents, Jerusalem, 1975
 Israel Shahak (ed), Begin & Co as they really are, Glasgow 1977
 Israel Shahak and Noam Chomsky, Israel's Global Role: Weapons for Repression (Studies in Geophysical Optics and Remote Sensing), Association of Arab-American University Graduates, Inc., April 1982, paperback, 
 Israel Shahak, Israel's Global Role : Weapons for Repression (Special Reports, No. 4), Association of Arab-American University Graduates, 1982, paperback
 Israel Shahak, Jewish History, Jewish Religion: The Weight of Three Thousand Years: Pluto Press, London, 1994, ; Pluto Press, London, 2008, 
 Israel Shahak, Open Secrets: Israeli Foreign and Nuclear Policies, Pluto Press, London, 1997
 Israel Shahak and Norton Mezvinsky, Jewish Fundamentalism in Israel (Pluto Middle Eastern Series), Pluto Press (UK), October, 1999, hardcover, 176 pages, ; trade paperback, Pluto Press, (UK), October, 1999, ; 2nd edition with new introduction by Norton Mezvinsky, trade paperback July, 2004, 224 pages

Articles
What Are My Opinions? March - April  1975  The Link - Volume 8, Issue 2
The Racist nature of Zionism and of the Zionistic State of Israel The Link, volume 8, issue 5  Winter 1975
 The `Historical Right' and the Other Holocaust, in Journal of Palestine Studies, 10, no. 3  (Spr. 1981): 27-34
 The Zionist Plan for the Middle East (a translation of Oded Yinon’s “A Strategy for Israel in the Nineteen Eighties” or the "Yinon Plan" , Association of Arab-American University Graduates, Inc., October 1982, paperback, 
 Israeli Apartheid and the Intifada, in Race and Class, 1988: Volume 30, no. 1: 1-13.
AFL-CIO Pension Funds Invested In Faltering Israeli Institutions  December 1988, Page 17 WRMEA.
 A History of the Concept of `Transfer' in Zionism, in Journal of Palestine Studies, 18, no. 3  (Spr. 1989): 22-37.
Human Rights in the Occupied Territories: Comparing the Hebrew and US Press Extra! Summer 1989
 Shamir's Manipulation of American Jewish Groups: A Disaster For All January 1991, Page 6 WRMEA
 Soviet Immigration Deprives Israelis of Housing and Arabs of Jobs January 1991, Page 27 WRMEA
 Journalists Link Israeli Financial Woes to Shamir-Bush Confrontation January 1991, Page 67 WRMEA
 Letter from Jerusalem Lies of Our Times, February 1991, p. 8.
  The Israeli Occupation Three Years After the Intifada March 1991, Page 27 WRMEA
 Israel Will Withdraw Only Under Pressure July 1991, Page 20 WRMEA
 Internal Criticism of Racism Would Be Called "Anti-Semitic" Outside Israel August/September 1991, Page 23 WRMEA
 Israel Uses Increased US Aid to Prepare 1992 Attack on Syria October 1991, Page 19 WRMEA
 Why Israel Can Never Repay the Loans to be Guaranteed by the US November 1991, Page 17  WRMEA
 America "No Longer Under Our Rule": Israelis Discuss Collapse of US Lobby December/January 1991/92, Page 11, WRMEA
 The Occupied Territories' True Ruler: Israel's Corrupt and Inefficient Shabak  February 1993, Page 28, WRMEA
 With Iraq Neutralized, Israelis Seek Catalyst for War With Iran April/May 1993, Page 15 WRMEA
 Can Religious Settlers Scuttle an Israeli-Palestinian Peace? By July/August 1993, Page 11
  Oslo Agreement Makes PLO Israel's Enforcer November/December 1993, Page 7-16  WRMEA
 Israeli Cultivation of Cuba Reflects Contempt for U.S. Policies  January 1994, Page 18 WRMEA
 Israel's State-Assisted Terrorism: "Settlers" as Armed Combatants February/March 1994, Page 16 WRMEA
  Poverty, Religious Instruction Breed Xenophobia in Israel July/August 1994, Page 19 WRMEA
 Settling the West Bank and Israeli Domestic Politics April/May 1995, Pages 15, 108-110 WRMEA
  Downturn in Rabin's Popularity Has Several Causes March 1995, pgs. 11, 97-98 WRMEA
 Israel's Discriminatory Practices Are Rooted in Jewish Religious Law  July/August 1995, pgs. 18, 119 WRMEA
 What Will Likud Do When It Comes to Power in Israel? December 1995, Pages 18, 82  WRMEA
 Rabin's Murder Spotlights Religious Influence in Israeli Police and Army January 1996, pgs. 8, 97-98 WRMEA
  The Real Israeli Interests in Lebanon, in WRMEA, July 1996, pgs. 19, 11
 Prime Minister Binyamin Netanyahu November/December 1996, pages 19, 106 WRMEA
 A Practical Look at Settlements From the Israeli Point of View March 1998, Pages 8, 86 WRMEA
Israel Shahak Articles, list of articles and interviews with Shahak in Middle East Policy Journal
 Israel Shahak comments & articles in  The New York Review of Books

Interviews
An Interview with Israel Shahak, interview in Journal of Palestine Studies, 4, no. 3 (Spr.  1975): 3-20.
No Change in Zion, interview in Journal of Palestine Studies, 7, no. 3 (Spr. 1978): 3-16.

Shahak, Israel